Liolaemus albiceps is a species of lizard in the family  Liolaemidae. It is native to Argentina.

References

albiceps
Reptiles described in 1995
Reptiles of Argentina
Taxa named by Fernando Lobo
Taxa named by Raymond Laurent